Naím Thomas Mansilla (born 16 October 1980 in Premià de Mar, Barcelona) is a Spanish singer and actor. He rose to fame by taking part in the first-ever series of Operación Triunfo (2001–2002). In addition to a musical career, he has appeared in a number of films, theatre works and musicals.

Career 
Son of Juan Thomas, and Patricia Mansilla, singers from Santa Cruz de Tenerife, Spain, he started studying music at age 6 and took part in a number of films and television series before applying for Operación Triunfo. Although he did not win the competition, he successfully released 3 albums.

He then moved to Los Angeles and he was cast in a major role in Desert of Blood, directed by Don Henry in 2006, and then in Sing Out in 2008.

After returning to Spain, he has released 909 nainonain with a personal innovating style, mixing of funk, international pop, Latin music, rap and reggaeton. Its first single was " Funkmenco", it is a test of this musical fusion.

In July 2007 he became a presenter of the television program "Plaza Mayor" on Madrid's Onda 6.

On 23 September 2016, he married Colombian painter Dahianha Mendoza in a village near Puerto del Rosario.

Awards
2008: Nominated for Revelation in a major musical for El Rey De Bodas during 6th edition of "Premios Chivas Telón".
2008: Nominated as best actor for El Rey De Bodas during "Premios Gran Vía".

Discography 

Grandes Éxitos (Edición Especial) (2002)
Tracks
I Finally Found Someone (with Verónica Romeo)
Adoro (with David Bisbal)
Don't Let the Sun Go Down on Me (with Alejandro Parreño)
Suave (with David Bisbal and Alejandro Parreño)
Guilty (with Verónica Romeo)
Everything I Do, I Do It For You (with Gisela Lladó)
Nada Cambiará mi Amor por Ti (with David Bisbal)
On Broadway
Nadie como Tú (with Nuria Fergó)
Superstition
Dance Little Sister
Last Christmas (with Verónica Romeo) (Bonus Track)
Triunfará el Amor (with Natalia) (Bonus Track)
Hijo de Hombre (Bonus Track)

No tengo prisa (Vale Music, 2002)
Selling 130,000 CDs venidos and going platinum.

Tracks
Cruel to Be Kind
Te Seguiría Buscando (Still Be Looking For You)
Estoy Enloqueciendo (Driving Me Crazy)
Ángeles
Con tu Amor
Para Siempre (Dreambaby)
Tú Volverás (Love Comes Along)
No Tengo Prisa
Arderé por ti (Only Love Remains)
Sólo Tú (Shame On You)
Ven a Funky Street (Funky Street)
Someone To Love

Con sólo una palabra...(Vale Music, 2003)
Selling 50,000 CDs and going gold.

Tracks
Una Noche
Caliente
Haz lo que Quieras
Me Puedes Jurar
Se Rompe el Corazón
Aprendiendo a Descubrir
Camino de Rosas
Con Sólo una Palabra Tuya
En el Lío
Cuando me Pregunten
Vas a Entender

909 (Nainonain) (Big Moon Records, 2007)

Tracks:
Funkmenco
Te lo Voy a Dar
La Amé Otra Vez
Kee Joe
Estoy de Moda
Lo que Quiero Decir (Interlude)
Me Muero por Verte
Living In Madrid
Conga
It's Over
Soy Igual que Tú
Me Miró
Es Todo "It's Over" (Spanish Version) (Bonus Track)
Funkmenco (Progressive Remix) (Bonus Track)

Filmography 
{| class="wikitable sortable"
|-
! Year
! Title
! Role
! Notes
|-
| 1993 
| Intruso 
| Ángel niño 
|
|-
|rowspan=3| 1996 
| Aquí llega Condemor 
| Chico 
|
|-
| Pesadilla para un rico 
| Juanma 
|
|-
| Muerte en Granada 
| Young Ricardo 
| aka 'Death in Granada'
|-
|rowspan=2| 1997 
| Gracias por la propina 
| Pepín adolescent 
|aka 'Thanks for the Tip '
|-
| Caricias 
| Nen 
|
|-
| 2000 
| Salsa 
| Stéphane 
| 
|-
| 2002
| Food of Love 
| Teddy 
|aka 'Manjar de amor'
|-
| 2003
| The Tulse Luper Suitcases (Part 1: The Moab Story) 
| Hercule 
|Tales by Peter Greenaway
|- 
 | 2005 
| Cry of the Winged Serpent 
| Pablo 
| aka 'El encantador de serpientes', (Short film) 
|-
|rowspan=3| 2008
| Desert of Blood 
| Cris 
|
|-
| 'Sing out 
|   
| 
|-
|}

Short filmsSolo en La BuhardillaEl Encantador de SerpientesTheatreUn Día (Mirall trencat)La del manojo de Rosas (Villa de Madrid Cultural Center)Las bicicletas son para el verano (Teatro principal of Málaga)El espejo rojo (Greg Barcelona)
Musicals
2007/2008: El rey de bodas 
2008/2009: 1973 The Millenium Musical 
2012: Edgar, El escritor de sombras'' (TV)

References

External links
Portal Mix Naím Thomas page
Naím Thomas IMDb page

1980 births
Living people
Spanish pop singers
Star Academy participants
Singers from Barcelona
21st-century Spanish singers
21st-century Spanish male singers